Egal International Airport, is an airport in Hargeisa, the capital of Somaliland, named after Somaliland's second president Muhammad Haji Ibrahim Egal, the airport underwent major renovations in 2012–2013. In 2002 the airport handled 85,800 passengers & 4,300 tons of cargo on a total of 6,120 landings.

History
The airport was opened in 1954 by the British RAF, an expansion program was launched shortly afterwards and by 1958 a taxiway, parking area and terminal building had been built. The airport was then modernized in the 1980s by the Siad Barre administration so as to accommodate larger aircraft and offer more flight destinations.

During the events leading up to the Somali Civil War in the early 1990s, the airport's infrastructure was significantly damaged. However, the facility was gradually rehabilitated over the next several years.

The airport was later renamed to Egal Airport after the veteran politician Muhammad Haji Ibrahim Egal. Egal served as Somalia's Prime Minister in the early 1960s during the country's post-independence civilian administration, before later becoming the second President of Somaliland.

In 2012, the airport's routes were temporarily suspended as its runway underwent major renovations, funded by the Somaliland authorities, Kuwait Fund and USAID. The facility was later reopened on 17 August 2013, with enlarged arrival and departure terminals, as well as five new wind turbines. An installed wind data monitoring station will also assist in powering the airport.

Facilities
In June 2014, the Government of Somaliland and the United States Agency for International Development (USAID) inaugurated a new wind energy project at the airport. The new wind power facility is under the authority of the Somaliland Ministry of Energy and Mineral Resources, which will manage it through a public-private partnership and oversee its daily operations. The initiative is part of the larger Partnership for Economic Growth, a bilateral program that has invested over $14 million in Somaliland's energy, livestock and agriculture sectors as well as in private sector development. The partnership aims in particular to establish local renewable energy technologies, with the new wind energy facility expected to offer a more cost effective alternative to diesel fuel. It is also slated to provide power to both the Hargeisa airport and the surrounding communities.

Airlines and destinations

The following airlines offer scheduled passenger service:

Accidents and incidents

See also
Aden Adde International Airport
List of airports in Somaliland

References

External links

 
 

Airports in Somaliland
Buildings and structures in Hargeisa
Airports established in 1954